The village of La Mongie is at  altitude. There are also residences at 1850 and the Tourmalet building at 1900. It lies below the Col du Tourmalet . La Mongie is a winter ski resort offering alpine skiing, snowboarding, snowpark, cross-country skiing, snowmobiles and hiking in snowshoes. In the summer cycling (on and off road) and the use of trials motorcycles is popular. The village has two small supermarkets, a tourist information centre, gift shops and many restaurants and ski rental shops. The nearby spa town of Bagnères-de-Bigorre offers large supermarkets and shops, restaurants, a casino, an 18-hole golf course and the natural spa baths themselves.

Access

Airports: Tarbes/Lourdes airport, . Toulouse Blagnac, .
Road: A64 exit 14 Tournay, dir Bagneres de Bigorre. Then La Mongie/Col du Tourmalet.
Rail: SNCF station Tarbes. Bus connection Bagneres/La Mongie.
The postcode is 65200.

Skiing

La Mongie is the largest skiable domain in the Pyrenees including the Superbarèges station. Over  there are 69 pistes and 43 lifts including poma tows and several four and six-man chair-lifts. A gondola lift gives access to some of the southern pistes while the Pic du Midi Funitel gives access to off-piste areas to the north. Of the 69 pistes, 23 are green, 19 blue, 21 red and 6 black. The domain has 173 snow cannons and there is one night piste.

Pic du Midi de Bigorre

It is also popular for cable car access to the Pic du Midi de Bigorre (2,872 m), on the summit of which is a 19th-century observatory. Work on the observatory started in 1878 and was completed in 1908. Observatory equipment has been in place since 1905 and in 1963 NASA funded the installation of a telescope for photographs of the Moon in preparation for the Apollo missions.

Tour de France
The  Tour de France has regularly passed through La Mongie on its passage over the Col du Tourmalet  since the inclusion of the Pyrenees in 1910. Three tour stages have terminated in La Mongie village, most recently in 2004.

Tour de France stage finishes

Image gallery

External links

 Tourmalet
 La Mongie dans le Tour de France 

Ski areas and resorts in France
Tourist attractions in Hautes-Pyrénées
Pyrenees